Curtis Edward Ford Jr. (March 24, 1922 – October 3, 2017) was an American politician.

Ford served in the United States Army Air Forces and the United States Marine Corps during World War II. Ford lived in Corpus Christi, Texas. He served as a Democratic member in the Texas House of Representatives from 1953 to 1957. Ford was an unsuccessful candidate for the Texas State Senate in 1956, finishing third in a three candidate race. Shortly after the end of his term in the Texas House, Ford ran for the United States Senate in a special election to replace Price Daniel. Ford received 767 votes, which was the 17th highest vote total in a 23 candidate field.

References

1922 births
2017 deaths
People from Corpus Christi, Texas
People from Sabine County, Texas
United States Army Air Forces personnel of World War II
Military personnel from Texas
Democratic Party members of the Texas House of Representatives